The members of the 23rd Manitoba Legislature were elected in the Manitoba general election held in November 1949. The legislature sat from February 14, 1950, to April 23, 1953.

A coalition government of the Liberal-Progressive Party and the Progressive Conservative Party held a majority of seats in the assembly. Douglas Lloyd Campbell served as Premier. The Progressive Conservatives withdrew from the coalition in 1950.

Edwin Hansford of the Co-operative Commonwealth Federation was Leader of the Opposition. Errick Willis of the Progressive Conservatives became opposition leader after his party left the coalition in 1950.

Wallace Miller served as speaker for the assembly until he was named to cabinet in August 1950.Nicholas Bachynsky succeeded Miller as speaker.

There were seven sessions of the 23rd Legislature:

Roland Fairbairn McWilliams was Lieutenant Governor of Manitoba.

Members of the Assembly 
The following members were elected to the assembly in 1949:

Notes:

By-elections 
By-elections were held to replace members for various reasons:

Notes:

References 

Terms of the Manitoba Legislature
1950 establishments in Manitoba
1953 disestablishments in Manitoba